|}

The Snow Fairy Fillies' Stakes is a Group 3 flat horse race in Ireland open to thoroughbred fillies and mares aged three years or older. It is run at the Curragh over a distance of 1 mile and 1 furlong (1,811 metres), and it is scheduled to take place each year in late August or early September.

The event was originally sponsored by Moyglare Stud and named after Dance Design, a successful Moyglare filly in the 1990s. It was established in 2005, and it was initially classed at Listed level. It was promoted to Group 3 status in 2009. In 2012 the race was sponsored by Lanwades Stud and run as the Lanwades Stud Fillies' Stakes. The 2014 running was sponsored by Xtravision and HMV in support of the Irish Autism Action charity. In 2016 the race was renamed after Snow Fairy, the winner of the Epsom Oaks and Irish Oaks in 2010.

Records
Most successful horse:
 no horse has won this race more than once

Leading jockey (2 wins):
 Joseph O'Brien - Up (2012), Say (2013)
 Pat Smullen - Chinese White (2009), Carla Bianca (2014)
 Fran Berry - Bible Belt (2011), Bocca Baciata (2015)
 Ryan Moore - Rain Goddess (2017), Goddess (2019)

Leading trainer (5 wins):
 Aidan O'Brien - Up (2012), Say (2013), Somehow (2016), Rain Goddess (2017), Goddess (2019)

Winners

See also
 Horse racing in Ireland
 List of Irish flat horse races

References

 Racing Post:

 galopp-sieger.de – Dance Design Stakes.
 horseracingintfed.com – International Federation of Horseracing Authorities – Snow Fairy Stakes (2018).
 pedigreequery.com – Dance Design Stakes – Curragh.

Flat races in Ireland
Curragh Racecourse
Mile category horse races for fillies and mares
Recurring sporting events established in 2005